Aglaüs Ernest Bouvenne (6 February 1829 - 1903) was a French draughtsman and engraver.

He was born in Paris His works include a bookplate for Victor Hugo.

References

Engravers from Paris
1829 births
1903 deaths
French draughtsmen
19th-century French engravers
19th-century French male artists